Leo Ou-fan Lee (born 10 October 1942) is a Chinese commentator and author who was elected Fellow of Academia Sinica in 2002. Lee also was a professor at Chinese University of Hong Kong, Princeton University, Indiana University, University of Chicago, University of California, Los Angeles, and Harvard University.

Lee has served as columnist of several publications, such as the Yazhou Zhoukan, Hong Kong Economic Journal, Ming Pao, and Muse.

Biography
Lee was born in a wealthy and highly educated family in Taikang County, Henan in 1942. Both his father Li Yonggang and mother Zhou Yuan were musicians and educators. His given name "Ou-fan" is the Chinese version of Orpheus, the Greek god of music.

Lee graduated from National Hsinchu Senior High School and National Taiwan University. He first took a master's degree from University of Chicago, where he was inspired by T.H. Tsien to study Chinese literature. He then went on to study at Harvard University, where his mentors included Benjamin I. Schwartz and John King Fairbank. He received his Doctor of Arts degree from Harvard University in 1970, majoring in history and East Asian languages.

After graduating he taught at Chung Chi College of Chinese University of Hong Kong, Princeton University, Indiana University, University of Chicago, University of California, Los Angeles, and Harvard University.

In 2002, Lee was elected Fellow of Academia Sinica.

Personal life
Lee was first wed to dancer Wang Xiaolan, the daughter of Hualing Nieh Engle and poet Paul Engle. After a turbulent divorce, he remarried in September 2000. Li Yuying, his second wife, who was the former wife of Deng Wenzheng. The couple was divorced, and Lee has since remarried.

Selected works

Books and edited volumes 
 My Harvard University Years
 The Romantic Generation of Modern Chinese Writers  Cambridge, Mass. : Harvard University Press, 1973. 
 Voices from the Iron House: A Study of Lu Xun  Bloomington: Indiana University Press, 1987. 
 Shanghai Modern: The Flowering of a New Urban Culture in China, 1930–1945  1999, Harvard University Press, 
 City Between Worlds: My Hong Kong. Cambridge, Mass. : Harvard University Press. 2008 
 An Intellectual History of Modern China, Merle Goldman and Leo Ou-fan Lee, Ed, Cambridge: Cambridge University Press 2002. 
 Land Without Ghosts: Chinese Impressions of America From the Mid-Nineteenth Century to the Present. translated and edited by R. David Arkush and Leo O. Lee. Berkeley : University of California Press,1989. 
 The Lyrical and the Epic: Studies of Modern Chinese Literature, Author: Jaroslav Průšek; edited by Leo Ou-fan Lee. Bloomington, Ind. : Indiana University Press, 1980. 
 The Appropriation of Cultural Capital: China's May Fourth Project Milena Doleželová-Velingerová, Oldrich Kral, and Graham Sanders Ed, Harvard University Asia Center, 2002. 
 Musings: Reading Hong Kong, China and the World, Leo Lee Ou-fan, Muse Books/East Slope Publishing : Hong Kong, 2011.

Essays, articles, and chapters

References

External links
 Leo Ou-fan Lee on Kafka in China Goethe-Institut China, Online Magazine, October 2014

1942 births
People from Taikang County
National Taiwan University alumni
Harvard University alumni
Living people
Chinese University of Hong Kong people
Chinese literary critics
Taiwanese people from Henan
Members of Academia Sinica